Brenden Jaimes (born May 28, 1999) is an American football guard for the Los Angeles Chargers of the National Football League (NFL). He was selected with the 159th pick of the 2021 NFL Draft. He played college football at Nebraska. He played high school football at Lake Travis High School.

College career

Jaimes was ranked as a threestar recruit by 247Sports.com coming out of Lake Travis High School. He committed to Nebraska on April 16, 2016.

Professional career
Jaimes was drafted by the Los Angeles Chargers with the 159th pick in the fifth round of the 2021 NFL Draft on May 1, 2021. On May 13, 2021, he signed his four-year rookie contract with Los Angeles.

References

External links

Living people
Los Angeles Chargers players
Nebraska Cornhuskers football players
American football offensive linemen
1999 births
Players of American football from Austin, Texas